Ellen Lohr (born 12 April 1965 in Mönchengladbach) is a German race car driver. She currently competes in the NASCAR Whelen Euro Series, driving the No. 99 Chevrolet Camaro for Dexwet-df1 Racing in the Elite 1 class.

She is one of Germany's most accomplished female drivers, having won a DTM (German Touring Car Masters) race, on 24 May 1992 in a Mercedes 190E 2.5-16 Evo2 on the Hockenheimring. Lohr is currently the only female driver to have won a DTM race.

When the DTM/ITC series was discontinued in 1996 she moved to truck racing and also competed in the  Deutsche Tourenwagen Challenge (DTC), a German touring car racing series. From 2004 Ellen Lohr competed in the Dakar Rally and similar events. She is an occasional television commentator for DTM races.

In 2008 Ellen Lohr competed in the German Rally Championship, the Deutsche Rally Meisterschaft, with Antonia Roissard de Bellet as her navigator. They also entered the 2008 Central Europe Rally (part of the Dakar Series).

After her initial retirement in 2016, she worked in Formula E in the marketing department of the Venturi race team in 2017. She returned to full-time competition in 2019 after she signed a contract with Dexwet-df1 Racing to compete in the NASCAR Whelen Euro Series in the No. 99 team. She had previously spectated the 2018 season finale at Zolder and expressed interests to compete in the series after spectating the race.

Racing record

Complete Deutsche Tourenwagen Meisterschaft results
(key) (Races in bold indicate pole position) (Races in italics indicate fastest lap)

Complete International Touring Car Championship results
(key) (Races in bold indicate pole position) (Races in italics indicate fastest lap)

† — Retired, but was classified as she completed 90% of the winner's race distance.

Complete NASCAR results

Whelen Euro Series – Elite 1

See also
Sabine Schmitz
Claudia Hürtgen
Jutta Kleinschmidt

External links

Career summary on Driver Database

References

1965 births
Living people
Sportspeople from Mönchengladbach
German racing drivers
German Formula Three Championship drivers
German female racing drivers
Deutsche Tourenwagen Masters drivers
International Formula 3000 drivers
Racing drivers from North Rhine-Westphalia
Porsche Supercup drivers
ADAC GT Masters drivers
24 Hours of Daytona drivers
NASCAR drivers
Mercedes-AMG Motorsport drivers
RSM Marko drivers
Walter Lechner Racing drivers
Morand Racing drivers
Josef Kaufmann Racing drivers
Nürburgring 24 Hours drivers
Porsche Carrera Cup Germany drivers